On Vacation may refer to:

 On Vacation (The Robot Ate Me album), 2004
 On Vacation (CFCF album), 2016
 "On Vacation", a song by Aimee Allen from A Little Happiness